Antonio Ramiro Pérez (born 2 February 1978), known as Antoñito, is a Spanish retired footballer who played as a striker.

During his 13-year professional career he played mainly with Sevilla and Xerez, amassing La Liga totals of 147 matches and 26 goals over six seasons and adding 150 games and 35 goals in Segunda División.

Club career
Antoñito was born in the Seville neighborhood of El Polígono de San Pablo, where he was known as "El Romario del Polígono", and played only amateur football until the age of 22, signing in the summer of 2000 with Sevilla FC – after turning down an offer from Real Betis – and being assigned to the reserve team, scoring 40 goals in his first season to help them promote to the third division. He made his debut with the main squad also during 2000–01, in the second level; after a loan to Andalusia neighbours Recreativo de Huelva in the same tier, he returned to play an important attacking role (mainly as a substitute) on a side that achieved two consecutive sixth places in La Liga.

For 2005–06, Antoñito was again loaned, being instrumental in Racing de Santander's narrow escape from top flight relegation. He netted nine goals during the campaign, notably an 88th-minute winner against CA Osasuna on 7 May 2006.

In the summer of 2006, Antoñito joined division two club Real Murcia, helping it achieve promotion. The following season he moved to Xerez CD in his native region, and extended his contract one more year late into 2008–09, being a very important unit for their first-ever promotion to the top tier.

In July 2011, after only six league goals for Xerez in two seasons combined, including three in the 2009–10 campaign in an immediate relegation from the top flight, 33-year-old Antoñito signed for CD Atlético Baleares of the third division.

Honours
Sevilla B
Tercera División: 2000–01

Sevilla
Segunda División: 2000–01

Xerez
Segunda División: 2008–09

References

External links

1978 births
Living people
Spanish footballers
Footballers from Seville
Association football forwards
La Liga players
Segunda División players
Segunda División B players
Tercera División players
Sevilla Atlético players
Sevilla FC players
Recreativo de Huelva players
Racing de Santander players
Real Murcia players
Xerez CD footballers
CD Atlético Baleares footballers